The Battle of Nowa Wieś was fought on 19 February 1831 between an army of 3,000 Polish rebels under Jozef Dwernicki and a Russian army of 20,000 under Cyprian Kreutz. Despite being outnumbered, the Polish rebels were victorious.

References 

Nowa Wies
Nowa Wies
Conflicts in 1831
Nowa Wies
February 1831 events
fr:Bataille de Nowa Wieś
pl:Bitwa pod Nową Wsią
ru:Сражение под Новой Весью